Treaty of Westminster  may refer to:

Treaty of Westminster (1153), also known as the Treaty of Wallingford
Treaty of Westminster (1462), also known as the Treaty of Westminster-Ardtornish
Treaty of Westminster (1511), an alliance during the War of the League of Cambrai
Treaty of Westminster (1527), an alliance during the War of the League of Cognac
Treaty of Westminster (1654), ending the First Anglo-Dutch War
Triple Alliance (1668), concluded in Westminster between Sweden, the General States and Great Britain
Treaty of Westminster (1674), ending the Third Anglo-Dutch War
Treaty of Westminster (1756), establishing neutrality between Great Britain and Prussia
The Statute of Westminster 1931, which transformed the British Empire into the British Commonwealth of Nations, is sometimes referred to (particularly in the former dominions) as a "Treaty" of Westminster